Hostage (also known as Savage Attraction) is a 1983 Australian crime film based on a true story.

Plot synopsis
Based on actual events, Christine Lewis is a teenager living in Wollongong in the 1970s and ends up marrying a sadistic German bank robber named Walter Maresch.

Cast
 Kerry Mack as Christine Maresch
 Ralph Schicha as Walter Maresch
 Michael Harrs as John Hoffman
 Clare Binney as Freda Hoffman
 Doris Goddard as Mrs. Hoffman
 Judy Nunn as Mrs. Lewis
 Henk Johannes as Wolfgang
 Burt Cooper as Helmut
 Ian Mortimer as Gary
 The Shamoroze family

References

External links 
 
 Hostage at Oz Movies

1983 crime films
1983 films
Australian crime drama films
Crime films based on actual events
Films about neo-Nazism
Films set in West Germany
Films set in New South Wales
Films shot in Germany
Films shot in New South Wales
1980s English-language films
Films directed by Frank Shields
1980s Australian films